Tuonela is the fourth full-length album by Finnish metal band Amorphis.

This marks the first album by the band to feature Santeri Kallio on keyboards who performed as a session member and joined the band after in 1998. The album is named from Tuonela, the realm of the dead in Finnish mythology.  The album also shares inspiration with many of the band's productions in the text and themes of the Kalevala, or Finnish Epic.

This album was the last release with original and long time bassist, Olli-Pekka Laine, until his return on 2018's Queen of Time.  Laine quit a year after this release in 2000, because of musical differences and to focus on his family.

Track listing

Personnel 
Amorphis
Pasi Koskinen – vocals
Tomi Koivusaari – rhythm guitars, sitar ("Greed")
Esa Holopainen – lead guitars, acoustic guitars
Olli-Pekka Laine – bass guitar
Pekka Kasari –  drums, percussion

Session musicians
Santeri Kallio – keyboards
Sakari Kukko – saxophone ("Nightfall" & "Tuonela"), flute ("Rusty Moon")

References 

1999 albums
Amorphis albums
Relapse Records albums
Concept albums